Huw Morus or Morys (1622 – 31 August 1709), also known by his bardic name Eos Ceiriog ("the nightingale of Ceiriog"), was a Welsh poet. One of the most popular and prolific poets of his time, he composed a large number of poems in a variety of metres. Morus's work bridges the gap between the strict-metre tradition of the Beirdd y Uchelwyr (the medieval "Poets of the Nobility") and popular verse.

Life
Huw Morus was born in 1622 and was the son of Forys ap Sion ap Ednyfed. The family lived at the farm of Pont-y-meibion in the parish of Llansilin near Glyn Ceiriog, in 1909 a memorial was erected at the farm.
Little is known about the poet's early years, but he may have been educated at the Ruthin Grammar School or at the Free School in Oswestry over the Shropshire border. 
However, in a poem Ar ofyn gostegion yn amser Cromwel, Morus complains of a seven years' apprenticeship, and there is an otherwise undocumented tradition that he had trained as a tanner.
He appears to have been unmarried and to have lived at the family farm for the remainder or his life.

Huw was sponsored by several members of the gentry of north-east Wales, including William Owen of Brogyntyn, Richard Wynn of Gwydir, Sir Thomas Mostyn of Gloddaeth, and Sir Thomas Myddelton of Chirk Castle. He composed several notable elegies, including one (in dialogue form) for Barbara Myddleton, the wife of Richard Myddleton of Plas Newydd, Llansilin, which is regarded as one of the finest in Welsh literature.

Morus was a staunch churchman and Royalist, many of his poems attacking Oliver Cromwell, the Roundheads, and the Commonwealth of England, although he escaped serious repercussions by giving his characters the names of various animals. He opposed the Welsh Puritanism of Morgan Llwyd, Vavasor Powell and Walter Cradock, and satirised them mercilessly in verse. He also composed a number of moral and devotional poems, as well as Christmas and "May" carols. He was given the name Eos Ceiriog for his love and nature poems, and pioneered a style based on established free-accented metres but containing perfect examples of cynghanedd. 
This developed a school of followers in the 18th century, though few of his imitators were able to approach his level of skill. Morus' poems are strongly rooted in the society of the time, and enable us to gain a glimpse into the lives of ordinary rural people in Wales in the second half of the 17th century.

Morus was buried on 31 August 1709, in Llansilin parish church; above his grave is a stained-glass window containing some of his englynion cyffes (confessional verses).

Notes

References

Welsh poets
1622 births
1709 deaths
People from Llangollen